KCS Computer Specialist–Mandaue City, also known as KCS–Mandaue, was a professional basketball team based in Mandaue which plays in the Visayas division of the Pilipinas VisMin Super Cup.

History
The KCS Computer Specialist is a basketball team formed in 2013 by team owner Ricky Verdida. The team was named after Verdida's Kiboy's Computer Solution (KJC) an electronics retail chain which sales mainly computer units and components. It competed in barangay-level competitions prior to joining the Pilipinas VisMin Super Cup in 2021.

In the inaugural 2021 VisMin Cup season, the KCS Computer Specialist as a team based in Mandaue, Cebu was grouped in the league's Visayas division. They clinched the Visayas division title by outbesting the MJAS Zenith-Talisay City Aquastars in the best-of-three final series. This feat also qualifies them to the Southern Finals. KCS settled for an overall second-place finish after conceding three games to the Basilan Jumbo Plastic in the best-of-five grand finals.

In August 2021, team owner Verdida announced that he would be selling the franchise of KCS Computer Specialist due to financial constraints.

External links
KCS Computer Specialist Pilipinas VisMin Super Cup Profile

References

2013 establishments in the Philippines
Pilipinas VisMin Super Cup teams
2021 disestablishments in the Philippines